Consequences is a live album released by jazz pianist Dave Burrell in duet with drummer  Billy Martin of Medeski, Martin & Wood. It was recorded on October 10, 2005 at the University of Pennsylvania's Houston Hall in Philadelphia, Pennsylvania. It was released on June 13, 2006 by the label Amulet.

Burrell and Martin perform quite forcefully throughout the show, leading to a style that is "not mildly avant-garde; it is very avant-garde."

Track listing 
 "Monsoon" (Burrell) – 18:36
 "New Species" (Martin) – 10:10
 "Moonbows" (Martin) – 9:21
 "Suspension" (Burrell) – 11:30
 "Kuliana" (Martin) – 9:06

Personnel 
 Dave Burrell — piano
 Billy Martin — percussion, cover design
 Yalitza Ferreras — package design
 Katsuhiko Naito — mastering, mixing

Reception 

Allmusic reviewer Alex Henderson comments that the album is not for the light of heart in jazz and who haven't been exposed to avant-garde. However, he does say that those who do appreciate the genre "will find a lot to enjoy about Burrell's inspired outside duets with Martin." Allaboutjazz.com reviewer Robert Iannapollo says the playing "shows Burrell’s creativity still flowing freely."

References 

Dave Burrell albums
Instrumental duet albums
2006 live albums